Ian Slockwitch (6 October 1941 – 23 August 2017) was an Australian rules footballer who played with Richmond in the Victorian Football League (VFL).

Notes

External links 
		

2017 deaths
1941 births
Australian rules footballers from Victoria (Australia)
Richmond Football Club players